The Milcovăț is a left tributary of the river Glavacioc in Romania. It discharges into the Glavacioc in Ghimpați.

References

Rivers of Romania
Rivers of Giurgiu County
Rivers of Teleorman County